Museen am Meer (Museums on the Sea; styled museen am meer) is an association of eight museums in the city centre of Kiel, Schleswig-Holstein, Germany,  on the edge of Kiel Fjord. The consortium was founded in 2010.

The project 

The responsible bodies of the eight museums in the project are the Christian-Albrechts-Universität zu Kiel (Kiel University), the GEOMAR | Helmholtz Centre for Ocean Research Kiel and the Landeshauptstadt Kiel (capital city kiel).

The museums

Collection of Classical Antiquities 

Face to face with antiquity: collection of Greek vases as well as casts of important Roman and Greek sculptures unique to Schleswig-Holstein.

Aquarium GEOMAR 

From Baltic Sea herring to tropical seahorse: local and exotic sea creatures presented in aquariums that simulate their natural habitats, outdoor seal pool and public feeding of the seals.

Museum of Fine Arts 

Art from the Dürer era through to the present day: permanent collection spanning all artistic genres, including works by Repin, Nolde and Richter, as well as special exhibitions on specific topics and artists.

Museum of Medical & Pharmaceutical History 

Insight into the history of medicine and pharmaceuticals: exhibition of historic instruments, collection of pathology specimens, interior of an old pharmacy and a doctor's office.

Kiel Municipal Gallery of Contemporary Arts 
New contemporary art: exhibitions of regional and international contemporary art, art from the Baltic Sea region, permanent exhibition of the works of the Expressionist artist Heinrich Ehmsen.

City and Maritime Museum 
Traces of Kiel history: permanent exhibition on the early history of the city and exhibitions on social and cultural history. In the former fish auction hall, built in 1910: permanent exhibition on Kiel's maritime history, pier with historic ships.

Zoological Museum Kiel 
Experience marine and evolutionary research at first hand: exciting display on the subject of marine science and research, Germany's most extensive exhibition of whale species, presentation of the origins of zoology in Kiel.

Notes

External links 
 english website of the association museen am meer

References

Sources 

 
 
 
 

Museums in Schleswig-Holstein
2010 establishments in Germany